Hinduism is a minority religion in Belgium. According to the PEW 2014, Hinduism is also the fastest growing religion in Belgium. Attempts have been done by the Hindu Forum of Belgium (HFB) to make Hinduism an officially-recognized religion in Belgium.

Demographics

In 2006, there were about 6500 Hindus in the country. In 2015, there were 7901 Hindus in Belgium. As of 2020, that number increased to 10,000.

Indian community in Belgium
There are about 7,000 people of Indian origin in Belgium.
A section of immigrants from Palanpur district in Gujarat entered the port city of Antwerp to work with the Jewish community in the diamond business, and eventually started their own. The Antwerp Indians still form a very tightly knit group and actively celebrate Indian festivals.
Indian software companies like Aricent, HCL, Daffodil Software Ltd and Infosys have a presence in Belgium.
Some farm labourers and shop-hands, mainly immigrants from North India, have also entered Belgium illegally.

Nepalese Hindu community in Belgium
It is estimated that around 8,000 Hindus of Nepalese origin live in Belgium. Leuven, Antwerp, Brussels and Bruges are the major cities where Nepali Hindus live. They organize cultural and religious activities on special occasions each year. The main rituals like Nwaran, Pasni, birthday, Bratabandha, marriage, and Griha prabhesh are performed at their homes. They also organize Devi Puja and Shiva Puja on Navaratri and Shivaratri.

The Nepali community has not built a temple yet but they intend to establish it to preserve Hindu culture and tradition. Shreemad Bhagabat Mahayagya was organized to meet this target but it is still in process. Ram Hari Shasti has contributed his time and effort as a Hindu priest for the Nepalese and Hindu community in Belgium.

Hindu organizations

HSS Belgium
The Hindu Swayamsewak Sangh Belgium (HSS Belgium) is a voluntary, non-profit, socio-cultural organization. HSS Belgium is inspired by the idea of "Vasudhaiva Kutumbakam", i.e. the whole world is one family, and conducts activities across Belgium in order to spread this message widely.

Shiva Temple Belgium
Hindu organisation in Flemish Ardennes - East-Flanders. Launched on September 10th, 2020
http://www.shivatemplebelgium.com

Hindu Forum of Belgium
The Hindu Forum of Belgium (HFB or FHB) was created by Hindu organisations in Belgium. It was launched on 16 March 2007 in Brussels.

Sanatan Dharma Sewa Parisad
This is the oldest Hindu cultural association in Belgium. Different Puja and praying are organized on special occasions like Shivaratri and Shravan month. In recent years, it has been celebrating Shree Krishnastami festival with ISKCON in Durbuy.

Jayatu Sanskritam
The Jayatu Sanskritam association works to promote Hindu traditional culture in Belgium. It was the main organizer of Shremad Bhagabat Mahapuran held in Leuven in 2011. It was a huge Mahayaga organized for the first time in Belgium and around 5000 devotees actively participated. Other associations like Sai Pariwar Belgium and Sanatan Dharma Sewa Parisad were actively present there.

Satya Sai Pariwar
Satya Sai Bhajan Mandali is a Hindu association of Nepalese people in Belgium. They organize Sai Bhajan every Sunday in Leuven, Antwerp and Ostend. They have also collaborated with Satya Sai Kendra of Brussels.

Hindu Temple Brussels
Around the year 2000, Indian families who had migrated to Brussels (Belgium) used to gather together in a local church or school to worship and celebrate Maa Durga Jaagran. These families nurtured a dream to build and maintain a full-fledged Hindu Temple in Brussels. Although it seemed a far behind idea back then, over the years the Indian community grew and the Hindu Mandir Association held fundraisers to build the Temple. Through patience and planning, the soft opening ceremony for the Brussels Mandir was performed on 19 February 2012 with donation from the Indian community of Brussels who ardently wished to make this dream a reality. Services are every Sunday and special events take place for the major Hindu festivals at the Mandir in Evere (Brussels)

Hindu Temple Ostend
Since 2012 there is also a Facebook group for a Hindu Temple in Ostend.

ISKCON in Belgium

The International Society for Krishna Consciousness (ISKCON) is active in Belgium. There are about 1,500 Hare Krishnas in Belgium. An ISKCON temple has been built in Septon-Durbuy and is known as Radhadesh. ISKCON centers have been established in Antwerp and Gent. In other towns, where no such center exists, "local get-together programs" are organized periodically at the homes of private individuals where worship of Krishna is conducted. This is generally organized on festive occasions like Janmashtami and Deepavali.

ISKCON has the following activities in Belgium:

 Centre-1: ISKCON Center, Antwerp, Belgium
 Centre-2: Local Get-together Program, Ghent, Belgium
 Center-3: ISKCON Radhadesh temple, in the Septon neighbourhood of Durbuy. This is the only proper ISKCON temple in Belgium. It includes:
 The main temple, a grand structure where daily worship is performed and festivals are celebrated
 Bhaktivedanta Library Services (BLS), a substantial library and research facility
 Bhaktivedanta College, a religious denomination educational campus, the only Hindu Vaishnava university in Belgium
 Radhadesh Govinda, the local edition of ISKCON's Food for Life program

Balinese Hinduism

Two Balinese Temples exist in the Pairi Daiza botanical garden in Belgium.

The 4-hectare (9.9-acre) Kingdom of Ganesha, which was opened in 2009, is the largest Indonesian garden in Europe, and reproduces the plant life and feel of the Indonesian archipelago, particularly Bali. Its collections include Pura Agung Shanti Buwana Balinese Hindu temple, East Nusa Tenggara and Toraja traditional houses and miniature replicas of Borobudur and Prambanan temples. In August 2009 the Indonesian government has sent a pair of Sumatran elephants to enliven the Indonesian Park. It is the first endangered animal breeding loan program that Indonesia ever had in Europe.

Community Life
According to the Ipsos survey, about 40% of  the participants considers Hindus as real Belgians and about 35% stated that Hindus are not true Belgians.

See also

 Bhaktivedanta College
 Hinduism in Austria
 Hinduism in Italy

References

External links
 
 
 
 

Hinduism by country
Hinduism in Europe
Religion in Belgium